Loki? is the first solo album from Arnaldo Baptista, the keyboardist, bassist and singer of the Brazilian band Os Mutantes. It was released in 1974 after a supposed nervous breakdown and it is considered one of the best albums in the 1970s Brazilian music scene. The album expresses his angst towards the height of post-modern society, along with the suffocating aspect of modernity: pollution, superpopulation, loneliness, etc.

It was listed by Rolling Stone Brazil at #34 on the list of 100 Greatest Brazilian Albums of All Time.

The album cover, signed by Aldo Luiz, features two overlapping pictures of Baptista against a star-spangled background. He is shirtless and holding a pellet gun and a bullet belt. The image was taken by the porch of his house in the Serra da Cantareira region. The back cover has a picture of an angel statue he bought in a cemetery.

Track listing

Personnel
 Arnaldo Baptista - piano, vocal; organ, clavinet, Moog synthesizer, twelve-string guitar
 Liminha - bass guitar
 Dinho Leme - drums
 Rogério Duprat - orchestral arrangements in "Uma Pessoa Só" and "Cê Tá Pensando que Eu Sou Loki?"
 Sergio Kaffa - bass guitar in "Desculpe"
 Rita Lee - backing vocal in "Não Estou Nem Aí" and "Vou Me Afundar na Lingerie"

References

1974 albums